Legislative elections were held in the Czech Republic on 2 and 3 June 2006 to elect the members of the Chamber of Deputies.

A major scandal broke out a few days before the elections when a classified report by Jan Kubice, the head of the anti-organised crime unit, was leaked to the media, accusing the ruling Social Democratic Party (ČSSD) of corruption and interference in police investigations. The Civic Democratic Party (ODS) and the Social Democratic Party, the two largest parties, obtained their highest percentage of votes ever. Turnout increased from the previous elections election in 2002.

The elections produced an evenly balanced result. One potential coalition – the Civic Democratic Party, Christian Democrats (KDU-ČSL) and Greens – won exactly half of the 200 seats, while the Social Democratic Party and the Communists (KSČM) held the other half, meaning that either coalition would struggle to pass legislation.

Following the elections, 230 days passed without a new government being formed. Eventually, a coalition government formed of the Civic Democratic Party, KDU-ČSL and the Greens passed a confidence vote on 19 January 2007, when two Social Democrat deputies abstained.

Campaign
Several weeks before the elections, police officer Jan Kubice, head of the squad for investigating organised crime, suggested that senior figures from the police and the government were trying to cover up their cooperation with organised crime. He was summoned before a parliament commission a few days before the election where he presented a document; the contents of the document were leaked immediately.

The document suggested that former Prime Minister Stanislav Gross had connections with the criminal underground and hinted that Prime Minister Jiří Paroubek was indirectly involved in a murder, dealt with the mafia and was a pedophile. It also contained information about minor officials, some of whom had already been imprisoned for bribery.

Paroubek and the others denied these claims and accused the opposition Civic Democratic Party of trying to manufacture a scandal to help them in the elections. After the elections, Paroubek said that the allegations cost his party, the Social Democratic Party, victory and that democracy was in as much danger as in 1948, when the Communists seized power. He raised the possibility of challenging the election result, though this did not happen.

Campaign Finances

Electoral system
The Chamber of Deputies consists of 200 members elected for a four-year term. Seats were allocated by proportional representation between those lists that gained over 5% of the national total of valid votes cast.

Party lists were presented in 14 regions, with votes cast for a list, although voters were allowed up to two preference votes for candidates on that list.

The Czech Republic has a parliamentary system of government, with ministers being responsible to the Chamber of Deputies. The Chamber is the most powerful organ of the state with power to override vetoes by the President and the Senate.

Opinion polls

Results

The election produced a deadlock, leaving all the coalitions which were considered likely before the election (ODS-KDU-ČSL-Greens; ČSSD-KSČM; ČSSD-KDU-ČSL-Greens) with less than the 101 votes required to pass legislation or to pass a confidence vote for the new cabinet in the Chamber of Deputies (100, 100 and 93 votes, respectively). Remaining possibilities included a grand coalition of the Civic Democratic Party and the Social Democratic Party, which would command a large majority, totalling 155 seats against 45; a minority cabinet of either of the 100-vote coalitions, which would have negotiate with the opposition to get the majority required for a confidence vote or to pass any legislation; or fresh elections.

On 26 June, the Civic Democratic Party, KDU-ČSL and the Greens announced that they had agreed on a coalition.

By region

Prague

Central Bohemian Region

South Bohemian Region

Plzeň Region

Karlovy Vary Region

Ústí nad Labem Region

Liberec Region

Hradec Králové Region

Pardubice Region

Vysočina Region

South Moravian Region

Olomouc Region

Zlín Region

Moravian-Silesian Region

References

External links
Official election web site, English
http://www.volby.cz – Official site with detailed results of all elections since 1994 in Czech and English (only for the later dates)
Adam Carr's Election Archive
Parties and elections

2006
Legislative election
Legislative election
Czech legislative election